Bryan is a masculine given name. It is a variant spelling of the masculine given name Brian.

Origin and meaning

The given name Bryan is a variant of the given name Brian.  Its spelling is influenced by the surname Bryan. The given name Brian is thought to be derived from an Old Celtic word meaning "high" or "noble".

Statistics

United States

In 2009, the names Brandon and Bryan were ranked as the 15th most common names for male twins, according to Social Security number applications for births.

People with the name
Bryan Adams (born 1959), Canadian musician
Bryan Alberts (born 1994), American–Dutch basketball player
Bryan Avery (born 1944), British architect
Bryan Breeding (born 1994), American singer
Bryan Bresee (born 2001), American football player
Bryan Brock, American football player
Bryan Bronson, American hurdler
Bryan Brown, Australian actor
Bryan Clauson, American race car driver
Bryan Cochrane, Canadian curler
Bryan Cohen (born 1989), American-Israeli basketball player
Bryan Coker, American academic administrator
Bryan Cox (born 1968), American football player and coach
Bryan Cranston, American actor
 Bryan Danielson (born 1981), American professional wrestler better known as Daniel Bryan
Bryan Duncan, American singer
Bryan Elsley, Scottish TV writer
Bryan Engram, Canadian football player
Bryan Erickson, lead singer of Velvet Acid Christ
Bryan Fairfax, an early American political figure and landowner from Virginia
Bryan Ferry, English musician
Bryan Fogarty, Canadian ice hockey player
Bryan Forbes, CBE was an English film director, screenwriter, film producer, actor, and novelist 
Bryan Fuller, American screenwriter and television producer
Bryan Green, Tasmanian politician
Bryan Habana (born 1983), South African rugby player
Bryan Henderson (born 1977), American football player
Bryan Herta, American race car driver and team owner
Bryan Hextall, Canadian ice hockey player
 Bryan Holland, or Dexter Holland, lead singer and guitarist for The Offspring
Bryan Ivie, American volleyball player
Bryan King (Australian footballer) (born 1935), Australian rules footballer
Bryan King (footballer, born 1947), English footballer
Bryan King (politician) (born 1968), member of the Arkansas Senate
Bryan Lee-Lauduski, American football player
Bryan Mone (born 1995), American football player
Bryan Mosley, English actor, Coronation Street
Bryan Lee O'Malley, Canadian cartoonist
Bryan Posthumus (born  1985), American politician
Bryan Reynolds, American critic and playwright
Bryan Robson, English footballer
Bryan Ruiz, Costa Rican footballer
Bryan Rust, American ice hockey player
Bryan Scary, American musician 
Bryan Matthew Sevilla, American adult film actor, known by his stage name James Deen
Bryan Singer, American film director
Bryan Smithson, American basketball player
Bryan Smyth, Irish singer
Bryan Trottier, Canadian ice hockey player
Bryan White (born 1974), American country music artist
Bryan Yipp, Canadian biologist

See also
Brien
Bryan (surname)
Brayan, a masculine given name
Boyan (given name), a Bulgarian and Slavic male given name

References

Given names
Masculine given names
English-language masculine given names
English masculine given names